Loge or Saturn XLVI is a natural satellite of Saturn. Its discovery was announced by Scott S. Sheppard, David C. Jewitt, Jan Kleyna, and Brian G. Marsden on 26 June 2006, from observations taken between January and April 2006.

Loge is about 6 kilometres in diameter, and orbits Saturn at an average distance of 23,142,000 km in 1314.364 days, at an inclination of 166.5° to the ecliptic (165.3° to Saturn's equator), in a retrograde direction and with an eccentricity of 0.1390. It has a tentative rotation period of about  hours, but this is highly uncertain as the light curve is the shallowest among all the irregular moons studied by Cassini–Huygens (amplitude about 0.07 magnitudes).

It was named in April 2007, after Logi, a fire giant from Norse mythology.

References

 Institute for Astronomy Saturn Satellite Data
 IAUC 8727: Satellites of Saturn June 30, 2006 (discovery)
 MPEC 2006-M45: Eight New Satellites of Saturn June 26, 2006 (discovery and ephemeris)
 IAUC 8826: Satellites of Jupiter and Saturn April 5, 2007 (naming the moon)

Norse group
Moons of Saturn
Irregular satellites
Discoveries by Scott S. Sheppard
Astronomical objects discovered in 2006
Moons with a retrograde orbit